Bridge FM (formerly TOC H Hospital Radio, Radio Tayside and Radio Liff) is an independent hospital radio station which is currently based in Ninewells Hospital in Dundee, Scotland that was launched in 1952. The radio station airs 24 hours a day with a range of music and talk show programmes.

Overview

History

TOC H Hospital Radio (1952-1975) 
Bridge FM was founded by Jim McClure and was originally founded as TOC H Hospital Radio in 1952. The station was originally set up to provide football commentary for patients at the hospital.

Radio Tayside (1975-1998) 
By 1975 broadcasts were received by Dundee Royal Infirmary, Royal Victoria Hospital and the recently opened Ninewells Hospital. At this time, the full name of the radio station was changed to "Radio Tayside Dundee Hospital Broadcasting Service," also known as Radio Tayside.

From 1975 to 1980 the studio continued expanding the radio service despite severe cash flow problems and changes in personnel. In 1978-79 a change in committee resulted in a decision to undertake a major face-lift to the studio and £10,000 was spent to create a new studio in a building next to the existing one that, during the television era, had been used as a workshop/darkroom.

Radio Liff (1998-2001) 
A steering committee was set up to examine how to best provide an in-house hospital radio service to meet the special needs of patients in Royal Dundee Liff Hospital. This included some former members of Radio Tayside who had sought to increase the provision of hospital radio services in Dundee. Liff Hospital did not have any form of wire broadcasting system so initially a restricted service was provided by members visiting each ward in Centre Division on a rota basis with a mobile disco unit. Although popular with patients and staff, the heavy commitment required from the volunteers meant that this service had to be withdrawn.

Radio Liff launched a public appeal in 1989 to help equip a broadcasting studio at the hospital. In just six months more than £6,500 was raised to transform accommodation donated by the hospital into a custom-built radio suite to allow cassette tapes to be recorded and sent to the wards. After the highly successful public appeal Mary, Countess of Strathmore officially opened the new studios of Radio Liff in March 1990 making Radio Liff the only volunteer-based hospital radio service operating in the Mental Illness sector in Scotland with 'broadcasting' started in April 1990. Later in December 1993 taped programmes were also distributed to Royal Victoria Hospital following the earlier withdrawal of Radio Tayside from providing broadcasts there.

Bridge FM (2001-present) 
After Royal Liff Hospital in Dundee shut down and patients moved to Ninewells Hospital, Radio Liff merged with Radio Tayside to form the Tayside Hospital Broadcasting Group and renamed the station to Bridge FM, which is derived from the Tay Road Bridge, connecting Dundee to Fife as the radio stations broadcast in both Tayside and Fife.

Presenters 
The current presenters of Bridge FM as of January 2022:
 Richard Smith
 Ken Anton
 Ray Oxley
 Ian Lees
 Trev Balneaves
 Judy Ryan
 Angus MacDougall
 Ronny Costello
 Paul Robertson
 Richard Smith
 Richard Todd
 Gordon Low
 Clifford Cooke
 Andrew McArtney
 Audrey McGalliard
 Robin Evans

Programmes

Current 
Here are the current programmes on Bridge FM as of 2018:
 The A to Z of Pop! with Richard Smith
 In The Drawing Room with Ken Anton
 The Music Jam
 Melodies for You with Ian Lees
 The Sunny Side of the Street with Ken Anton
 The Best of Rock with Trev Balneaves

Syndicated 
 TBC

References 

Radio stations in Dundee
Hospital radio stations